Lamar Neagle (born May 7, 1987) is an American professional soccer player who plays for the Tacoma Stars in the Major Arena Soccer League. He has spent most of his career with the Seattle Sounders FC of Major League Soccer over the course of several stints; Neagle has also played for Montreal Impact and D.C. United in Major League Soccer, as well as Mariehamn in Finland.

Career

Youth and college
Neagle attended Thomas Jefferson High School, where he was a three-year starter and helped them to a 16-2-4 record and the State 4A championship as a senior. He also broke a 31-year-old school record by scoring six goals in one game as well as being the Seattle Post-Intelligencers pick for High School All-Star Team during his senior year. As a youth, Neagle also played for the Norpoint Chivas soccer club located in Northeast Tacoma.

Upon graduating high school, Neagle attended and played college soccer for the University of Nevada Las Vegas. At UNLV he played on the three-time first team All-Mountain Pacific Sports Federation selection, and played every game but one in his four-year career. He also led the team in goals scored his last two seasons with a total of 9 each year. During his senior year, Neagle was named second team All-Far-West Region 2008.

During his college years he also played with Des Moines Menace of the USL Premier Development League, making 24 appearances and scoring six goals in his two years with the club.

Seattle Sounders FC
Neagle was a pre-season trialist with the Seattle Sounders FC for two weeks in Southern California. During the trials, Neagle played in two games and had two assists. After graduating university, Neagle returned to train with the team on May 13, 2009.

On June 10, 2009, the Sounders announced that Neagle had signed and been added to the official roster as a Senior Developmental player. Coach Sigi Schmid said, "It's good to sign a local product to our team. Lamar's got excellent speed and he's a player who can play in a number of positions. He's very comfortable on the flank and has played on the left side as well as the right. He will get a look from us as an outside player, either in midfield or at the back". Neagle was the fourth player from Washington state to sign with the Sounders after Chris Eylander, Kevin Forrest, and Kasey Keller.

Neagle first appeared on the Seattle roster during the highly anticipated Portland Timbers game. Neagle was also on the team roster for the Houston Dynamo and Kansas City Wizards games but sat on the bench. Neagle played in the Kitsap Pumas game which yielded a 6-0 victory. Neagle made his unofficial debut with a friendly against Chelsea on July 18, 2009. When asked about playing against English Premier League team, Neagle responded "It's kind of surreal. I grew up watching these guys play for Chelsea. You never think you're going to get a chance to play against them. It was a great experience. Pretty intimidating, but it was fun."

Neagle was waived by Seattle on November 25, 2009, having never played a competitive first team game for the team. He subsequently signed for Charleston Battery (who employ him as a forward) in the USL Second Division, and made his competitive professional debut on April 17, 2010, in a game against the Charlotte Eagles.

In September 2010, following the conclusion of the 2010 USL2 season, Neagle transferred to IFK Mariehamn of the Finnish Veikkausliiga. After a successful preseason trial, Neagle was again signed by Seattle on March 2, 2011.

In 2011, Neagle worked his way onto the pitch as a frequent sub and occasional starter for MLS matches, also playing important roles in the US Open Cup and CONCACAF Champions League. On August 27, 2011, Neagle netted the first home MLS hat-trick for the Sounders in a 6–2 victory over the Columbus Crew, at the time the leaders in the Eastern Conference.

Montreal Impact
Neagle was traded to Montreal Impact on February 18, 2012, along with teammate Mike Fucito, in exchange for Eddie Johnson.

After scoring his first goal for Montreal against his former club, Sounders FC, during the club's first match at the renovated Stade Saputo. Neagle notched his second of the MLS campaign against the San Jose Earthquakes on August 18, 2012, a  shot that went on to win AT&T Goal of the Week honors.

First return to the Sounders
On January 27, 2013, the Sounders traded an international roster spot to the Montreal Impact in order to re-acquire Neagle for his third stint with the team.

D.C. United
Neagle was traded to D.C. United on December 7, 2015 in exchange for allocation money. On March 7, Neagle made his debut and scored his first goal with United in a 1–4 away loss to LA Galaxy in the 2016 Major League Soccer season opener. He played in total of 56 games, scored 11 goals, and recorded 6 assists.

Second return to the Sounders
On August 7, 2017, D.C. United traded Neagle to the Sounders for a fourth round pick in the 2018 MLS SuperDraft.

On November 19, 2018, Seattle declined their contract option on Neagle.

Indoor career
On March 8, 2019, Neagle signed with the Tacoma Stars of the indoor Major Arena Soccer League. He was previously on trial with Phoenix Rising of the USL Championship. Neagle joined the Federal Way Coaching staff for the 2019–20 season. He re-signed with the Tacoma Stars in October 2019 for their 2019-2020 season.

Neagle rejoined the Stars on December 10, 2021.

Personal life
Lamar is the son of John Brown and Bridget Neagle and Frankie and Maria Lawson. He has five siblings named Shedrick, Jamaal, Tanisha, Daisia, and Jasmine. He was married to Natalie Hanley at the Hollywood Schoolhouse in Woodinville on February 15, 2014.

Career statistics

Honors

ClubCharleston Battery USL Second Division Champions (1): 2010
 USL Second Division Regular Season Champions (1): 2010Seattle Sounders FC'
 Lamar Hunt U.S. Open Cup: 2011, 2014
 MLS Supporters' Shield: 2014

Individual
 USL Second Division Most Valuable Player (1): 2010

References

External links
 

1987 births
Living people
African-American soccer players
American soccer players
American expatriate soccer players
Des Moines Menace players
Seattle Sounders FC players
Charleston Battery players
IFK Mariehamn players
CF Montréal players
D.C. United players
Tacoma Defiance players
Soccer players from Washington (state)
UNLV Rebels men's soccer players
USL League Two players
USL Second Division players
Veikkausliiga players
Major League Soccer players
USL Championship players
Expatriate footballers in Finland
Expatriate soccer players in Canada
Association football wingers
Association football forwards
American expatriate sportspeople in Finland
American expatriate sportspeople in Canada
21st-century African-American sportspeople
20th-century African-American people